Đinh Trọng Đoàn, pen name Ma Văn Kháng (Đống Đa, Hanoi, 1 December 1936) is a Vietnamese writer. He was one of the first doi moi authors to appear alongside Lê Lựu and Dương Thu Hương.

Works
Against the Flood

References

Vietnamese writers
1936 births
Living people